The 1945 Caernarvon Boroughs by-election was a parliamentary by-election held on 26 April 1945 for the British House of Commons constituency of Caernarvon Boroughs.

Previous MP
The seat had become vacant when the constituency's Liberal Member of Parliament (MP), David Lloyd George (1863–1945) had been elevated to the peerage as the 1st Earl Lloyd George of Dwyfor in January 1945. He died two months later, on 26 March 1945, before the by-election took place.

Lloyd George was first elected as the constituency's MP at the 1890 Caernarvon Boroughs by-election, caused by the death of the previous Conservative MP. During a long and distinguished political career the former MP had served in many high offices, notably as Chancellor of the Exchequer 1908–1915 and Prime Minister of the United Kingdom 1916–1922. He had led the Liberal Party, after the retirement of H. H. Asquith, from 1926 to 1931.

Candidates
The election took place during the Second World War. Under an agreement between the Conservative, Labour and Liberal parties, who were participating in a wartime coalition, the party holding a seat would not be opposed by the other two at a by-election. Accordingly, the Liberal Party nominated a candidate, but no Labour or Conservative representative was put forward. Plaid Cymru, which was not party to the electoral agreement, selected a candidate; so a contested poll took place.

Two candidates were nominated. The list below is set out in descending order of the number of votes received at the by-election.

1. The Liberal Party candidate, supporting the coalition government, was 40-year old Seaborne Davies (1904–1984). After winning the by-election, he served in Parliament between April and July 1945 only, as he was defeated by a Conservative candidate in the 1945 United Kingdom general election.

2. Representing Plaid Cymru was Prof. J E Daniel. He also contested Caernarvon Boroughs in the 1945 general election.

Result

See also
 Caernarvon Boroughs constituency
 List of United Kingdom by-elections
 United Kingdom by-election records

References

Further reading
 British Parliamentary Election Results 1918–1949, compiled and edited by F.W.S. Craig (Macmillan Press 1977)
 Who's Who of British Members of Parliament, Volume III 1919–1945, edited by M. Stenton and S. Lees (Harvester Press 1979)

1945 elections in the United Kingdom
By-elections to the Parliament of the United Kingdom in Welsh constituencies
History of Caernarfonshire
1945 in Wales
1940s elections in Wales
Politics of Caernarfonshire